The Acme was a wooden top sail schooner that was driven ashore at Seal Rocks, New South Wales while carrying timber from Camden Haven to Sydney under the command of Captain James Henry Jackson on the 15 July 1876. There were no casualties.

References

Further reading 
Online Database's
Australian National Shipwreck Database
Australian Shipping - Arrivals and Departures 1788-1968 including shipwrecks 
Encyclopaedia of Australian Shipwrecks - New South Wales Shipwrecks 

Books
Wrecks on the New South Wales Coast. By Loney, J. K. (Jack Kenneth), 1925–1995 Oceans Enterprises. 1993 . 
Australian Shipwrecks - vol1 1622-1850, Charles Bateson, AH and AW Reed, Sydney, 1972, Call number 910.4530994 BAT 
Australian shipwrecks Vol. 2 1851–1871 By Loney, J. K. (Jack Kenneth), 1925–1995. Sydney. Reed, 1980 910.4530994 LON
Australian shipwrecks Vol. 3 1871–1900 By Loney, J. K. (Jack Kenneth), 1925–1995. Geelong Vic: List Publishing, 1982 910.4530994 LON
Australian shipwrecks Vol. 4 1901–1986 By Loney, J. K. (Jack Kenneth),  1925–1995. Portarlington Vic. Marine History Publications, 1987 910.4530994 LON
Australian shipwrecks Vol. 5 Update 1986 By Loney, J. K. (Jack Kenneth),  1925–1995. Portarlington Vic. Marine History Publications, 1991 910.4530994 LON

Ships built in New South Wales
1876 ships
Maritime incidents in July 1876
Shipwrecks of the Mid North Coast Region
1871–1900 ships of Australia
Coastal trading vessels of Australia
Schooners of Australia